The 1949 NYU Violets football team was an American football team that represented New York University as an independent during the 1949 college football season. 

In their third and final season under head coach Edward "Hook" Mylin, the Violets compiled a 3–4 record and were outscored 181–146.

The team played all of its games at neutral sites or as the visitor.

Schedule

References

NYU
NYU Violets football seasons
NYU Violets football